Gopinath (Devnagari: गोपीनाथ) is a form of the Hindu god Krishna. He is also known as Gopinathji or Gopinathji Maharaj. Gopinath is associated with gopis (cow-herding girls) who Krishna grew up with.

References

External links 
The Original Swaminarayan Sampraday (Gopinathji)
Forms of Krishna
Swaminarayan Sampradaya